Predloka is a small village in the City Municipality of Koper in the Littoral region of Slovenia.

History
Predloka was a hamlet of Loka until 1986, when it was administratively separated and made a settlement in its own right.

Church
The parish church in the settlement is dedicated to John the Baptist.

References

External links
Predloka on Geopedia

Populated places in the City Municipality of Koper